A fish ladder, also known as a fishway, fish pass, fish steps, or fish cannon is a structure on or around artificial and natural barriers (such as dams, locks and waterfalls) to facilitate diadromous fishes' natural migration as well as movements of potamodromous species. Most fishways enable fish to pass around the barriers by swimming and leaping up a series of relatively low steps (hence the term ladder) into the waters on the other side. The velocity of water falling over the steps has to be great enough to attract the fish to the ladder, but it cannot be so great that it washes fish back downstream or exhausts them to the point of inability to continue their journey upriver.

History

Written reports of rough fishways date to 17th-century France, where bundles of branches were used to make steps in steep channels to bypass obstructions. 

A pool and weir salmon ladder was built around 1830 by James Smith, a Scottish engineer on the River Teith, near Deanston, Perthshire in Scotland. Both the weir and salmon ladder are there today and many subsequent salmon ladders built in Scotland were inspired by it. 

A version was patented in 1837 by Richard McFarlan of Bathurst, New Brunswick, Canada, who designed a fishway to bypass a dam at his water-powered lumber mill. In 1852–1854, the Ballisodare Fish Pass was built in County Sligo in Ireland to draw salmon into a river that had not supported a fishery. In 1880, the first fish ladder was built in Rhode Island, United States, on the Pawtuxet Falls Dam. The ladder was removed in 1924, when the City of Providence replaced the wood dam with a concrete one. 

As the Industrial Age advanced, dams and other river obstructions became larger and more common, leading to the need for effective fish by-passes.

Types

Pool and weir One of the oldest styles of fish ladders. It uses a series of small dams and pools of regular length to make a long, sloping channel for fish to travel around the obstruction. The channel acts as a fixed lock to gradually step down the water level; to head upstream, fish must jump over from box to box in the ladder.
Baffle fishway Uses a series of symmetrical close-spaced baffles in a channel to redirect the flow of water, allowing fish to swim around the barrier. Baffle fishways need not have resting areas, although pools can be included to provide a resting area or to reduce the velocity of the flow. Such fishways can be built with switchbacks to minimize the space needed for their construction. Baffles come in variety of designs. The most common design is the Larinier pass, named after the French engineer who designed them. They are suitable for coarse fish as well as salmonids, and can be built large enough to be used by canoes. The original design for a Denil fishway was developed in 1909 by a Belgian scientist, G. Denil; it has since been adjusted and adapted in many ways. The Alaskan Steeppass, for example, is a modular prefabricated Denil-fishway variant originally designed for remote areas of Alaska. Baffles have been installed by Project Maitai in several waterways in Nelson, New Zealand, to improve fish passage as part of general environmental restoration.
Fish elevator (or fish lift) Breaks with the ladder design by providing a sort of elevator to carry fish over a barrier. It is well suited to tall barriers. With a fish elevator, fish swim into a collection area at the base of the obstruction. When enough fish accumulate in the collection area, they are nudged into a hopper that carries them into a flume that empties into the river above the barrier. On the Connecticut River, for example, two fish elevators lift up to 500 fish at a time, 52 feet (15.85 m), to clear the Holyoke Dam. In 2013, the elevator carried over 400,000 fish.
Rock-ramp fishway Uses large rocks and timbers to make pools and small falls that mimic natural structures. Because of the length of the channel needed for the ladder, such structures are most appropriate for relatively short barriers. They have a significant advantage in that they can provide fish spawning habitat.
Vertical-slot fish passage Similar to a pool-and-weir system, except that each "dam" has a narrow slot in it near the channel wall. This allows fish to swim upstream without leaping over an obstacle. Vertical-slot fish passages also tend to handle reasonably well the seasonal fluctuation in water levels on each side of the barrier. Recent studies suggest that navigation locks have a potential to be operated as vertical slot fishways to provide increased access for a range of biota, including poor swimmers.
Fish siphon Allows the pass to be installed parallel to a water course and can be used to link two watercourses. The pass utilises a syphon effect to regulate its flow. This style is particularly favoured to aid flood defence.
Fish cannon A wet, flexible pneumatic tube uses air pressure to suck in salmon one at a time and gently shoot them out into the destination water. The system was originally designed by Bellevue, Washington company Whooshh to safely move apples.
Borland Fish Lift This is similar to a canal lock. At the downstream end of the obstruction, fish are attracted to a collecting pool by an outflow of water through a sluice gate. At fixed intervals, the gate is closed, and water from the upper level fills the collecting pool and an inclined shaft, lifting the fish up to the upstream level. Once the shaft is full, a sluice at the top level opens, to allow fish to continue their journey upstream. The top sluice then closes, and the shaft empties for the process to begin again. A number of Borland fish lifts have been built in Scotland, associated with hydro-electric dams, including one at Aigas Dam on the River Beauly.

Effectiveness
Fish ladders have a mixed record of effectiveness. They vary in effectiveness for different types of species, with one study showing that only three percent of American Shad make it through all the fish ladders on the way to their spawning ground. Effectiveness depends on the fish species' swimming ability, and how the fish moves up and downstream. A fish passage that is designed to allow fish to pass upstream may not allow passage downstream, for instance. Fish passages do not always work.
In practice a challenge is matching swimming performance data to hydrodynamic measurements. Swim tests rarely use the same protocol and the output is either a single-point measurement or a bulk velocity. In contrast, physical and numerical modelling of fluid flow (i.e. hydrodynamics) deliver a detailed flow map, with a fine spatial and temporal resolution. Regulatory agencies face a difficult task to match hydrodynamic measurements and swimming performance data.

Culverts

During the last three decades, the ecological impact of culverts on natural streams and rivers has been recognised. While the culvert discharge capacity derives from hydrological and hydraulic engineering considerations, this results often in large velocities in the barrel, which may prevent fish from passing through.

Baffles may be installed along the barrel invert to provide some fish-friendly alternative. For low discharges, the baffles decrease the flow velocity and increase the water depth to facilitate fish passage. At larger discharges, baffles induce lower local velocities and generate recirculation regions. However, baffles can reduce drastically the culvert discharge capacity for a given afflux, thus increasing substantially the total cost of the culvert structure to achieve the same design discharge and afflux. It is believed that fish-turbulence interplay may facilitate upstream migration, albeit an optimum design must be based upon a careful characterisation of both hydrodynamics and fish kinematics. Finally the practical engineering design implications cannot be ignored, while a solid understanding of turbulence typology is a basic requirement to any successful boundary treatment conducive of upstream fish passage.

See also
 Culvert
 Elver pass
 First "Denil" style dam in Illinois
 Fish doorbell
 Fish migration
 Fish screen
 Pitlochry fish ladder
 Salmon run

Citations

General and cited references 
 To Save the Salmon (1997) US Army Corps of Engineers.
 Fish-friendly waterways and culverts - Integration of hydrodynamics and fish turbulence interplay (2017) The University of Queensland.

External links 

 A study of the hydraulics of flow over fishways
 Construction of a vertical slot fish passage and eel ladder for the St. Ours Dam (Richelieu River, Québec)
 Fish Passage Center
 Fish passes. Design, dimensions and monitoring, Food and Agriculture Organization of the United Nations/Deutscher Verband für Wasserwirtschaft und Kulturbau (DVWK), Rome, 2002   (Zip download from FTP area of the FAO's European Inland Fisheries Advisory Commission (EIFAC))
 U.S. Orders Modification of Klamath River – Dams Removal May Prove More Cost-Effective for allowing the passage of Salmon—The Washington Post, January 31, 2007
 Fish Ladders and Elevators not working.
 Upstream fish passage in box culverts: how do fish and turbulence interplay? by Dr Hang Wang and Professor Hubert Chanson, School of Civil Engineering, University of Queensland

Aquatic ecology
Dams
Ecological connectivity
Fish migrations